Jung Woong-in (born January 20, 1971) is a South Korean actor.

Filmography

Film 

 Drive (TBA) as Na Jin-soo 
  Seoul Vibe (Netflix Film/ 2022) as Chief Prosecutor 
 Child for Children (2022) as  Seung-won 
 The Prison (2017)
 Time Renegade (2016)
 Veteran (2015)
 Fists of Legend (2013)
 Marrying the Mafia 4: Unstoppable Family (2011) 
 Meet the In-Laws (2010) (cameo)
 City of Damnation (2009)
 Santamaria (2008) 
 Are You Crazy? (2007)
 Flushed Away (animated, 2006) (Korean dubbing)
 Mr. Wacky (2006) (cameo)
 The Magicians (2006) 
 My Boss, My Teacher (2006) 
 Don't Tell Papa (2004)
 The Circle (2003) 
 2424 (2002) 
 My Boss, My Hero (2001)
 The Foul King (2000)
 A Great Chinese Restaurant (1999)
 The Quiet Family (1998)
 Seven Rascals (1996)
 Boss (1996)
 Rehearsal (1995)

Television series 

 The Good Bad Mother (2023) - Oh Tae-soo
 Our Blooming Youth (2023) - Cho Won-bo
 Insider (2022) - Cameo
 Idol: The Coup (2021) 
 Delayed Justice (2020)
 Woman of 9.9 Billion (2019)
 Chief of Staff (2019)
 Ms. Ma, Nemesis (2018)
 Goodbye to Goodbye (2018) 
 Switch (2018)
 Prison Playbook (2017)
 My Sassy Girl (2017)
 Monster (2016)
 Sweet, Savage Family (2015)
 Yong-pal (2015)
 Splendid Politics (2015)
 Pinocchio (2014)
 Love in Memory 2 - Dad's Notes (Daum Storyball mobile drama, 2014)
 Potato Star 2013QR3 (2014) (cameo, ep 15)
 Empress Ki (2013)
 Drama Special "Happy! Rose Day" (2013)
 I Can Hear Your Voice (2013)
 SOS - Save Our School (Drama Special Series - 2012)
 Amore Mio (Drama Special Series -2012) 
 Ojakgyo Family (2011-2012)
 The King of Legend (2010-2011)
 Coffee House (2010) 
 High Kick Through the Roof (2009-2010) (cameo, ep 103) 
 Three Men (2009)
 Queen Seondeok (2009) 
 Last Scandal (2008) 
 Moon Hee (2007)
 Rude Women (2006)
 Hong Guk-young (2001)
 Because of You (2000)
 Three Friends (2000)
 Kuk-hee (1999)
 Wave (1999)
 Eun-shil (1998)
 White Nights 3.98 (1998)
 Soonpoong Clinic (1998)
 Yesterday (1997)
 천일야화 (1996)

Web series 
 The Mansion (2022)
 Pachinko (2022) – Koh Jong-yul
 Big Bet (2022)
People of the Blue House (2022) – Mayor of Seoul

Variety show 
 Dad! Where Are We Going? (2014)

Theater 
 University of Laughs (2010) 
 Dandelions in the Wind (2009)

Awards 
 2019 KBS Drama Awards: Best Supporting Actor in a Miniseries
 2018 SBS Drama Awards:  Excellence Award, Actor in a Daily and Weekend Drama
 2014 SBS Drama Awards: Special Acting Award, Actor in a Serial Drama (Endless Love)
 2014 MBC Entertainment Awards: PD Award (Dad! Where Are We Going?)
 2013 SBS Drama Awards: Special Acting Award, Actor in a Miniseries (I Can Hear Your Voice)
 2013 APAN Star Awards: Acting Award, Actor (I Can Hear Your Voice)
 2013 Korea Drama Awards: Top Excellence Award, Actor (I Can Hear Your Voice)
 2011 KBS Drama Awards: Best Supporting Actor (Ojakgyo Family)
 1999 SBS Drama Awards: Best New Actor (Eun-shil)

References

External links 
 
 
 

1971 births
Living people
South Korean male film actors
South Korean male television actors
South Korean male stage actors
Seoul Institute of the Arts alumni
People from Jecheon
20th-century South Korean male actors
21st-century South Korean male actors